A liana is a long-stemmed, woody vine that is rooted in the soil at ground level and uses trees, as well as other means of vertical support, to climb up to the canopy in search of direct sunlight. The word liana does not refer to a taxonomic grouping, but rather a habit of plant growth – much like tree or shrub. It comes from standard French liane, itself from an Antilles French dialect word meaning to sheave.

Ecology
Lianas are characteristic of tropical moist broadleaf forests (especially seasonal forests), but may be found in temperate rainforests and temperate deciduous forests. There are also temperate lianas, for example the members of the Clematis or Vitis (wild grape) genera. Lianas can form bridges amidst the forest canopy, providing arboreal animals with paths across the forest. These bridges can protect weaker trees from strong winds. Lianas compete with forest trees for sunlight, water and nutrients from the soil. Forests without lianas grow 150% more fruit; trees with lianas have twice the probability of dying.  Some lianas attain to great length, such as Bauhinia sp. in Surinam which has grown as long as 1970 feet (600 meters). Hawkins has accepted a length of 4,900 feet (1.5 km) for an Entada phaseoloides The longest Monocot liana is Calamus manan   (or calamus ornatus )at exactly 787 feet (240 meters). 

Lianas may be found in many different plant families. One way of distinguishing lianas from trees and shrubs is based on the stiffness, specifically, the Young's modulus of various parts of the stem. Trees and shrubs have young twigs and smaller branches which are quite flexible and older growth such as trunks and large branches which are stiffer. A liana often has stiff young growths and older, more flexible growth at the base of the stem.

Habitat
Lianas compete intensely with trees, greatly reducing tree growth and tree reproduction, greatly increasing tree mortality, preventing tree seedlings from establishing, altering the course of regeneration in forests, and ultimately affecting tree population growth rates. Lianas also provide access routes in the forest canopy for many arboreal animals, including ants and many other invertebrates, lizards, rodents, sloths, monkeys, and lemurs. For example, in the Eastern tropical forests of Madagascar, many lemurs achieve higher mobility from the web of lianas draped amongst the vertical tree species. Many lemurs prefer trees with lianas for their roost sites. Lianas also provide support for trees when strong winds blow. However, they may be destructive in that when one tree falls, the connections made by the lianas may cause many other trees to fall.

As noted by Charles Darwin, because lianas are supported by other plants, they may conserve resources that other plants must allocate to the development of structure and use them instead for growth and reproduction. In general, lianas are detrimental to the trees that support them. Growth rates are lower for trees with lianas; they directly damage hosts by mechanical abrasion and strangulation, render hosts more susceptible to ice and wind damage, and increase the probability that the host tree falls. Lianas also make the canopy of trees more accessible to animals which eat leaves. Because of these negative effects, trees which remain free of lianas are at an advantage; some species have evolved characteristics which help them avoid or shed lianas.

Examples
Some families and genera containing liana species include:

References

External links
 Lianas and Climbing Plants of the Neotropics
 Lianas and Climbing Plants of the Neotropics: Family Treatments
 'Vines and Lianas' by Rhett Butler, at http://rainforests.mongabay.com/0406.htm
 

 
Plant morphology
Biology terminology
Plant life-forms
Plants by habit